Legislative elections were held in Portuguese Macau on 9 October 1988, returning 17 members of the Legislative Assembly of Macau, with six directly elected by electorates, six indirectly elected by special interest groups and five appointed by the Governor.

The Electoral Union consisted of pro-Beijing Chinese and Macau-born Portuguese, which retained their influence in the city. The voter turnout dropped to a record low of 29.92%. 6 directly elected seats, elected through D'Hondt method, were divided between the conservatives and democrats.

Governor Carlos Melancia later appointed Ana Perez, Anabela Ritchie, Neto Valente, Philipe Xavier, Rui Afonso to the Legislative Assembly, ensuring the control of Portuguese in the parliament. The 4th Legislative Assembly convened the first meeting on 10 November 1988. Carlos D'Assumpção was re-elected as the President of the Assembly while Edmund Ho became the vice.

Results

Mmembers

References

Macau
Legislative
Elections in Macau
Macau